Roper Lake State Park Hot Spring is a single geothermal mineral spring in Roper Lake State Park, Safford, Arizona.

Water profile
The hot mineral water emerges from the ground at 99 °F.

Location
The hot springs are located in the State Park which offers camping, cabins, swimming, hiking and fishing. They are handicapped accessible, with railings, and one can drive a vehicle up to the spring. About eight people can fit in the single rock and concrete pool.

See also
 List of hot springs in the United States
 List of hot springs in the world

References

Hot springs of Arizona
State parks of Arizona